"Time to Grow" is the second single and title track of British R&B singer Lemar's second album, Time to Grow (2004). The single became Lemar's sixth top-10 hit in the UK, peaking at number nine on the UK Singles Chart.

Lyrical content

The song lyrics refer to Lemar breaking up with a girl and him trying to get over it. He clearly is still hurting over her, but she has moved on from him. He doesn't know what to do or where to go because he still feels something for her, but she doesn't feel the same. He knows that the best thing for him to do is to move on, but he just can't do it. He misses her terribly and wishes that he could go back to when she felt something for him.

Track listings
 CD: 1
 "Time to Grow" (radio edit)
 "Time to Grow" (5am Remix)

 CD: 2
 "Time to Grow" (album version)
 "Time to Grow" (Kings of Soul Remix)
 "Time to Grow" (Kardinal Beats Remix—no rap)
 "Freak You Right"
 "Time to Grow" (CD-ROM video)

Charts

References

2004 songs
2005 singles
Lemar songs
Songs about heartache
Songs written by Lemar
Sony Music UK singles